Custis is a surname which may refer to:

People related to George Washington
Daniel Parke Custis (1711–1757), son of John Custis and first husband of Martha Washington
Eleanor Parke Custis Lewis (1779–1854), step-granddaughter of George Washington
George Washington Parke Custis (1781–1857), son of John Parke Custis and adopted son of George Washington
Hancock Custis, a member of the Virginia House of Burgesses (1710–1712), brother of John Custis
John Custis (1678–1749), member of the Virginia governor's Council and father of Daniel Parke Custis
John Parke Custis (1754–1781), son of Daniel Parke Custis and stepson of George Washington
Martha Washington (1731–1802), Martha Custis (as the widow of Daniel Custis) before she married George Washington
Mary Anna Custis, daughter of George Washington Parke Custis and wife of General Robert E. Lee
Mary Custis Vezey (1904-1994), poet and translator, related through her father, Henry Custis Vezey (1873–1939)
Mary Lee Fitzhugh Custis (1788–1853), wife of George Washington Parke Custis

Others
Ace Custis (born 1974), American retired professional basketball player
Bernie Custis (1928–2017), first black quarterback in North American football
Donald L. Custis (1917–2021), United States Navy vice admiral